ZNK-FM is a radio station in Nassau, Bahamas broadcasting an adult contemporary radio format.

External links 
 

Radio stations in the Bahamas
Seventh-day Adventist media
Radio stations established in 2012